Ada J. (Jane) Graves (14 April 1870 – 8 July 1918) was a British children’s writer. She was born in Benares, Bengal, the daughter of James Speed Graves and Charlotte Graves. In 1881 her family was living in Midlothian, Scotland.

Graves is known for two books published round the turn of the 20th century: The House by the Railway (1896) illustrated by Rosa C. Petherick and Four Little People and their Year at Silverhaven (1898) illustrated by Florence Meyerheim. She also wrote The Little Brown House (1902).

Controversy
In 2011, it was claimed that significant sections of E. Nesbit's novel The Railway Children may have been plagiarised from Ada J. Graves’s The House by the Railway, which was published in 1896 and later serialised in a 1904 children’s annual. Both works bear remarkable similarities in plot. In both stories, children avert a train disaster by waving red flags made from pieces of their clothing to attract the driver’s attention. The young heroes in both books are presented with engraved watches. Both stories also end with a family being reunited.

Personal life
Graves, who was distantly related to the war poet Robert Graves, married Dr. Edward Rainsford Mumford (1876-1953), in Newfoundland Cathedral on 23 October 1905. Her husband later became a missionary to India. She died in the Srimangal earthquake of 8 July 1918. She had run back into her home in Kalighat to look for her daughter, not realising that the girl had already been taken to safety by a nanny. She was killed by the falling roof and debris. Her sister Frances Gordon the suffragette, survived the earthquake. Her niece was the poet Ida Affleck Graves.

References

1870 births
1918 deaths
English children's writers
Victorian women writers
English people of Indian descent
Srimangal Upazila
Graves family